Vouzas is a surname. Notable people with the surname include:

Antonios Vouzas (born 1993), Greek footballer
Argyrios Vouzas, Greek revolutionary and doctor
Vasilis Vouzas (born 1966), Greek footballer and manager